Stanhopea annulata is a species of orchid occurring from southern Colombia to Ecuador.

References

External links 

annulata
Orchids of Colombia
Orchids of Ecuador